Penn Halt was the smallest of all stops on the Wombourne Branch Line. It was opened by the Great Western Railway in 1925 and closed in 1932. The line was single track and the halt was a single platform. It suffered from poor patronage, as with all the stations on the branch. This may have been, in part, due to the somewhat strange positioning of the station by the GWR, several miles from the nearest settlement. All that remains is a lot of bushes and a sign stating where the halt once was.

This is now part of the South Staffordshire Railway Walk which covers the trackbed from Tettenhall railway station to Gornal Halt railway station.

References

Further reading

Disused railway stations in Wolverhampton
Former Great Western Railway stations
Railway stations in Great Britain opened in 1925
Railway stations in Great Britain closed in 1932